Bill Steinke is a Canadian former professional darts player who competed in the 1980s.

His first major win was the British Columbia Open in 1983. Between 1983 and 1986, he won every major tournament on the west coast of Canada and the United States including the Klondike Open, Seattle Open, Oregon Open, San Francisco Open and the St. Pat's Classic in San Diego. He participated in the 1986 BDO World Darts Championship but was defeated in the first round by Welshman Peter Locke. He won the 1985 Canadian National Championship.

Steinke's biggest tournament win was the Los Angeles Open which is the warm-up to the North American Open and had the top players competing from around the world.

World Championship results

BDO
 1986: Last 32: (lost to Peter Locke 0–3)

External links
Profile and stats on Darts Database

British Darts Organisation players
Canadian darts players
Living people
Year of birth missing (living people)